Malin is a surname. Notable people with the surname include:

 David Malin, British-Australian astronomer and photographer
 Edward Malin, British actor
 Jesse Malin, front-man for New York City hardcore band Heart Attack
 Joanne Malin, British TV journalist
 Michael C. Malin, American astronomer and space scientist